The 15th BET Awards was held at the Microsoft Theater in Los Angeles, California on June 28, 2015 and was televised on BET. This year marked the ceremony's 15th anniversary and the milestone was celebrated throughout the show, which was hosted by Anthony Anderson and Tracee Ellis Ross.

The nominees were announced on May 18, 2015. Nicki Minaj and Chris Brown lead the nominations with six each. Beyoncé and Lil Wayne followed with four each. Beyoncé was the big winner of the night with 3 awards, including Video of the Year for "7/11". Nicki Minaj and Chris Brown both won 2 each. Smokey Robinson was honored with the Lifetime Achievement Award, while Janet Jackson was honored with the inaugural Ultimate Icon: Music Dance Visual Award. Radio host Tom Joyner was also honored, receiving the Humanitarian Award. The show also featured a reunion of the Bad Boy Records roster, which included performances by founder Sean "Diddy" Combs as well as Lil' Kim, Mase, 112, Faith Evans, The Lox, and more.

Nominations and winners
The following is a list of nominees. The winners were announced on June 28, 2015.

Performers

Presenters
 Michael B. Jordan
 Zendaya
 Laverne Cox
 Sanaa Lathan
 Michael Ealy.      * Kelly Rowland
 Morris Chestnut

Special awards
 Smokey Robinson, Lifetime Achievement Award
 Tom Joyner, Humanitarian Award
 Janet Jackson, Ultimate Icon: Music Dance Visual Award

References

External links
 
 

BET Awards
2015 music awards